The Austrian Women's Volleyball Cup is an Asutrian women's Volleyball Cup competition held every single year and it is organized by the Austrian Volleyball Federation (Österreichischen Volleyballverband-ÖVV), it was established in 1980.

Competition history

Winners list

Honours by club

References

External links
  Austrian Volleyball Association  

Volleyball in Austria